Kamukakudi  is a village in the Kudavasal taluk of Tiruvarur district in Tamil Nadu, India.

Demographics 

As per the 2001 census, Kamukakudi had a population of 1,629 with 798 males and 831 females. The sex ratio was 1041. The literacy rate was 65.71.

References 

 

Villages in Tiruvarur district